The Aiguilles de Baulmes (1,559 m) are a mountain of the Jura range, located north of Baulmes in the canton of Vaud.

References

External links
Aiguilles de Baulmes on Hikr

Mountains of the canton of Vaud
Mountains of the Jura
Mountains of Switzerland
One-thousanders of Switzerland